Galvin may refer to:

 Galvin (surname)
 Galvin, Washington, U.S.
 Galvin railway station, Melbourne, Australia
 Galvin Manufacturing Corporation, later renamed Motorola

See also 
 Luigi Galvani, Italian physician and physicist
 Galvanism, a muscle contraction stimulated by an electric current